Ashburton Domain is a park in the centre of Ashburton, Mid Canterbury, New Zealand. Covering 37 hectares, it includes gardens, a lake, a cricket ground and other sporting facilities.

Cricket has been played on the ground since the 1870s. The first major match on the ground came when Ashburton County played the touring Tasmanian team in 1884. The ground held its first senior interprovincial match when Canterbury played Otago in the 1980/81 Shell Cup.  Three further List A matches have been held on the ground, the last of which saw Canterbury play Central Districts in the 1988/89 Shell Cup. It is the home ground for the Mid Canterbury cricket team, which competes nationally in the Hawke Cup.

References

External links
Ashburton Domain at ESPNcricinfo
Ashburton Domain at CricketArchive

Cricket grounds in New Zealand
Sports venues in Canterbury, New Zealand
Sport in Ashburton, New Zealand